Luis Mena Vado (c. 1865 – 20 May 1928) was the President of Nicaragua from 27 to 30 August 1910, after the fall of the government of General José Santos Zelaya. He later became acting President in rebellion. Mena was a conservative, part of the coalition government that also included liberal Juan Jose Estrada and conservatives Emiliano Chamorro and Adolfo Diaz.

Liberal-Conservative Revolution 1912
He was one of the leaders along with Benjamin Zeledon and Marcelo Castañeda
On 23 September, General Mena, then the top leader of the revolutionaries, surrendered without a fight to the high command of the marines in the city of Granada and was sent into exile in Panama.

References

Presidents of Nicaragua
Conservative Party (Nicaragua) politicians
1865 births
1928 deaths